The UMI (Unified Media Interface) interconnect is the link between an AMD Accelerated Processing Unit (APU) and the FCH (Fusion Controller Hub). It is similar to Intel's DMI. The Fusion Controller Hub is similar to the Southbridge of earlier chipsets.

References

AMD technologies
Computer buses